Edward Vizard (7 June 1889
– 25 December 1973) was a Welsh international footballer who became a manager. He spent almost all his playing career at Bolton Wanderers.

Playing career
Born in Cogan, Wales Vizard joined Bolton Wanderers in September 1910 from Barry, making his debut later that year. From here, he never looked back making the outside left position his own for the next 18 seasons. In total, he made 512 appearances for the Trotters scoring 70 goals.

During his time at Bolton, he appeared in the 1923, 1926 and 1929 FA Cup Finals, all three victoriously. He remained in the team until retiring in 1931 aged 41, becoming the oldest player to play for the club (a record only broken in 1995 by Peter Shilton).

Vizard also won 22 international caps for Wales.

Managerial career

Swindon Town
In April 1933 Vizard gave up his position as coach of the 'A' team with Bolton Wanderers in order to become the manager of Swindon Town, a position he held until 1939.

QPR
After the 1938/39 season, Vizard left the club to take the reins at Queens Park Rangers, succeeding Billy Birrell. Due to the outbreak of World War II causing the suspension of league football, he never had the chance to manage them in a competitive game. Despite this they were relatively successful in wartime football and in 1944 he replaced Major Frank Buckley as manager of Wolverhampton Wanderers.

Wolves
He was appointed Wolves manager in April 1944, and despite taking them to third place in the First Division in the first peacetime season in 1946/47, he was replaced by Stan Cullis in the summer of 1948.

References

1889 births
1973 deaths
Sportspeople from Penarth
Welsh footballers
Wales international footballers
English Football League players
Barry Town United F.C. players
Bolton Wanderers F.C. players
Swindon Town F.C. managers
Welsh football managers
English Football League managers
Queens Park Rangers F.C. managers
Wolverhampton Wanderers F.C. managers
Chelsea F.C. wartime guest players
Association football forwards
FA Cup Final players
Association football coaches
Bolton Wanderers F.C. non-playing staff